Baars is a hamlet in the Dutch province of Overijssel. It is located in the municipality Steenwijkerland, about 4 km northwest of the town of Steenwijk.

It was first mentioned in 1340 as Baersdijc, and refers to a farm named Baers which is the Dutch word for the European perch. It is a statistical entity, and has its own postal code. It used to have place name signs, but they have been removed again. The hamlet shares resources with neighbouring .

References

External links 
 Official website with Witte Paarden (in Dutch)

Populated places in Overijssel
Steenwijkerland